A triangulation of a set of points  in the Euclidean space  is a simplicial complex that covers the convex hull of , and whose vertices belong to . In the plane (when  is a set of points in ), triangulations are made up of triangles, together with their edges and vertices. In the plane, triangulations are special cases of planar straight-line graphs.

A particularly interesting kind of triangulations are the Delaunay triangulations. They are the geometric duals of Voronoi diagrams.

Triangulations have a number of applications, and there is an interest to find the "good" triangulations of a given point set under some criteria as, for instance minimum-weight triangulations. Sometimes it is desirable to have a triangulation with special properties, e.g., in which all triangles have large angles (long and narrow ("splinter") triangles are avoided).

Given a set of edges that connect points of the plane, the problem to determine whether they contain a triangulation is NP-complete.

Regular triangulations 
Note that, in order for this construction to provide a triangulation, the lower convex hull of the lifted set of points needs to be simplicial. In the case of Delaunay triangulations, this amounts to require that no  points of  lie in the same sphere.

Combinatorics in the plane 
This follows from a straightforward Euler characteristic argument.

Algorithms to build triangulations in the plane 
Triangle Splitting Algorithm : Find the convex hull of the point set  and triangulate this hull as a polygon. Choose an interior point and draw edges to the three vertices of the triangle that contains it. Continue this process until all interior points are exhausted.

Incremental Algorithm : Sort the points of  according to x-coordinates. The first three points determine a triangle. Consider the next point  in the ordered set and connect it with all previously considered points  which are visible to p.

Time complexity of various algorithms 

The following table reports time complexity results for the construction of triangulations of point sets in the plane, under different optimality criteria, where  is the number of points.

See also
Mesh generation
Polygon triangulation

Notes

References

 
 
 
 
 
 
 
 
 
 

Triangulation (geometry)

de:Gitter (Geometrie)#Dreiecksgitter